The Serbia Open is a professional tennis tournament. It is part of the ATP 250 tournaments. Held in Belgrade, Serbia and played on outdoor clay courts, the event was held for the first time in 2009, from May 4–10. It was the first for Serbia, as the country had never before hosted an Association of Tennis Professionals tournament.

The tournament was held as a combined men's and women's event as of 2021. This marked the first time in history a WTA tournament was held in Serbia.

History 
The tournament is owned and run by the family of Serbian tennis player Novak Djokovic, who through their company Family Sport purchased the ATP Tour date from the organizers of the Dutch Open in 2008, then arranged with the local city of Belgrade authorities for the plot of land where the venue was built, and convinced the government of Serbia under prime minister Mirko Cvetković to support the event through state-owned enterprises, primarily Telekom Srbija. At the time of their purchase in 2008, Djokovic was the World No. 3 player, having won his first Grand Slam title earlier that year.

Djokovic's uncle Goran Djokovic was the tournament director from its inception, until he resigned the post in late May 2012, a month after the tournament's 2012 edition. In 2013, Serbia Open was replaced on the ATP schedule by the newly established Power Horse Cup in Düsseldorf. 

The tournament returned to the calendar in April 2021, replacing the Hungarian Open with its now new director, Djordje Djokovic.

Novak Djokovic won the tournament twice, in 2009 and 2011.

Past finals

Men's singles

Women's singles

Men's doubles

Women's doubles

See also
List of tennis tournaments

Notes

References

External links

Official website
(ATP) tournament profile

 
Tennis tournaments in Serbia
Clay court tennis tournaments
Sport in Belgrade
ATP Tour
WTA Tour
Recurring sporting events established in 2009
2009 establishments in Serbia